Achaea radama is a species of moth of the family Erebidae. It is found in Madagascar.

References

External links
Illustration from Novara Expedition Zoologicae, Bd.2, Abth.2, Plate 66

Achaea (moth)
Moths of Madagascar
Erebid moths of Africa
Moths described in 1874